Graig is an electoral ward and coterminous community (parish) of the city of Newport, South Wales.

The ward is bounded by the Ebbw River and M4 motorway to the east, the city boundary to the north and west. The southern boundary is formed by a line from the M4/A467 intersection in a roughly westerly direction as far as the city boundary. The area is governed by the Newport City Council.

The ward contains Bassaleg, Rhiwderin and the hamlet of Lower Machen. It also contains the western half of the Foxgloves estateas the Ebbw passes through the centre, the eastern half is in Rogerstone.

Location of a large Roman fort and its earthworks can be seen from the motorway.

References

External links 

Communities in Newport, Wales
Wards of Newport, Wales